Parner, is a historic town in Ahmednagar District,  Maharashtra, India. It is the headquarters town for Parner Taluka. Parner was named after Rishi Parashar, whose son Maharishi Ved Vyas wrote famous epic "Mahabharat".

Geography

Notable residents
 Senapati Pandurang Mahadev Bapat (12 November 1880 – 28 November 1967) was revolutionary and Indian freedom fighter. He was born in Parner village. Nathan and Grace also are Parners and live in their own parner village.

References

Villages in Ahmednagar district
Villages in Parner taluka